Ujmisht is a village and a former municipality in Kukës County, northeastern Albania. At the 2015 local government reform it became a subdivision of the municipality Kukës. The population at the 2011 census was 1,797.

Notable people
 Baba Hajji Dede Reshat Bardhi, Grandfather of  Bektashi Order
 Muharrem Bajraktari, World War II fighter and politician

References

Former municipalities in Kukës County
Administrative units of Kukës
Villages in Kukës County